Keene is an unincorporated community in Kearney County, Nebraska, United States.

History
A post office was established at Keene in the 1870s. Keene was the name of a workman who temporarily lived in the area.

References

Unincorporated communities in Kearney County, Nebraska
Unincorporated communities in Nebraska